Andrew Perry (born 20 May 1984) is a former English cricketer.  Perry is a right-handed batsman who bowls right-arm medium pace.  He was born at Chichester, Sussex.

Perry represented the Sussex Cricket Board in a single List A match came against the Worcestershire Cricket Board in the 2nd round of the 2003 Cheltenham & Gloucester Trophy which was held in 2002.  In his only List A match, he scored 4 runs.

References

External links
Michael Harrison at Cricinfo
Michael Harrison at CricketArchive

1984 births
Living people
Sportspeople from Chichester
English cricketers
Sussex Cricket Board cricketers